The Medal of French Gratitude was a French honour medal created on 13 July 1917 and solely awarded to civilians.  The medal was created to express gratitude by the French government to all those who, without legal or military obligation, had come to the aid of the injured, disabled, refugees, or who had performed an act of exceptional dedication in the presence of the enemy during the First World War.  The creation of this distinction was mainly the result of unsuccessful offensives of General Nivelle in 1917 and the serious crisis of confidence in France.  The French government thus wanted to thank those who, despite the crisis, were always volunteering. It has three classes: bronze, silver, and gold. Nearly 15,000 people and communities were recipients of this award.  The medal is no longer awarded, the last award was on 14 February 1959.

Award statute
The Medal of French Gratitude was awarded following World War I to the following:
Persons who, in the presence of the enemy, have performed acts of exceptional dedication, the duration of these services having spanned one year (Decree of December 2, 1917)
Deserving communities (whose members were are not allowed to wear the ribbon or individual medal by decree of December 2, 1917);
Citizens of Alsace-Lorraine who were deported, exiled or imprisoned, before 1 August 1914, by German authorities because of their attachment to France and those in the departments occupied themselves, for their courageous stand while exposed to reprisals (Decree of 1 April 1922);
Prisoners of war, civilian prisoners, hostages and deportees because of exceptional acts courage and dedication for the allied cause. The inhabitants of occupied areas or Alsace and Lorraine who helped these people (decrees of 29 November 1926 and December 8, 1928).

Award description
The first model was a 30 mm in diameter circular bronze, silver or gilded medal depending on the level of the award, the design was by engraver Jules Desbois.  The obverse bore charity personified by France supporting a wounded soldier.  On the reverse at centre, the relief circular inscription "RECONNAISSANCE FRANÇAISE" along the circumference with at centre and a palm leaf on the right.

The second model is a 32 mm in diameter circular bronze, silver or gilded medal depending on the level of the award, the design was by engraver Maurice Delannoy.  The obverse bears a woman wearing a Phrygian cap representing France offering a palm.  On the reverse, the relief inscription RECONNAISSANCE FRANÇAISE around a wreath of roses surrounding an escutcheon bearing the initials "RF" (for République Française).

The medal hung from a 37 mm wide white silk moiré ribbon with tricolour 2 mm wide edge stripes of blue, white and red, the blue being outermost.

Notable recipients (partial list)

French citizens
Father Émile Blanchet
Politician Raoul Bleuse
Herminie de La Brousse de Verteillac, Princesse of Léon
Doctor Alfred Cerné
Suzanne Desprès
Doctor Léandre Dupré
Politician Charles Ehrmann
Resistance fighter Charles Fenain
Marquise Corisande de Gramont
Paul-Jacques Kalb
Lawyer Pierre Kédinger
General Marie-Pierre Kœnig
Resistance fighter Albert Kohan
Writer Camille Marbo
Resistance member Paul Rassinier
Resistance member Eric Reach

Foreign nationals
Ettie Rout, for her safe sex work among the Allied troops during World War I 
Samuel Beckett, for his secretarial work with the Resistance cell known as 'Gloria SMH' 
Lucile Atcherson Curtis, diplomat 
Barbara Borsinger, nurse 
Prince Boun Oum 
Alan Burns, 4th Baron Inverclyde 
Marquesa del Ter 
James Michael Curley, mayor of Boston, 
Louis Dewis, activist on behalf of Belgians during World War I and noted landscape artist 
Charlotte Fairbanks, surgeon 
Perrin Comstock Galpin, served with Herbert Hoover in Belgian food relief immediately after World War I 
Mary Frances Crowley, for her work at Saint-Lô 
Marie Galway 
Ethel Gray, nurse 
Julia Green Scott, philanthropist 
Lotta Hitschmanova 
Catherine Haviland 
Aline Rhonie Hofheimer, pilot 
Charlotte Kellogg 
John Adams Kingsbury, Assistant director of general relief, American Red Cross, France 
Helen Kirkpatrick, war correspondent 
Tracey barrett kittredge, Captain commissioned through the Naval Reserve Officer Training Corps 
Anna Elizabeth Klumpke, artist 
Rachel Gertrude Moseley MM,  First Aid Nursing Yeomanry FANY, ambulance driver 1918
Louise Mountbatten  nurse with British Red Cross, an aunt of Prince Philip, Duke of Edinburgh, later Queen of Sweden 
Decima Moore 
Norman Holmes Pearson 
Vere Ponsonby, 9th Earl of Bessborough 
Harriet Rice, Doctor United States
Harold Ross, journalist who co-founded The New Yorker magazine in 1925 
Hunter Scarlett 
Helen Sexton, surgeon 
Belle Skinner, philanthropist 
Alfa Tofft, Save the Children after WW II 
Frank A. Vanderlip, banker and journalist 
Mariana Griswold Van Rensselaer, president of the American Fund for french Wounded, New York Committee

Communities decorated

The Medal of French Gratitude was awarded to six French and eight foreign cities.

French cities
Annemasse, Thonon and Evian 1921
Céret 1946
Cerbère and Hochfelden 1947

Foreign cities
Schaffhausen (1919), Basel, Geneva and Lausanne (1921), Montreux (1953). 
Mons (1920). 
Luxembourg (1921). 
Narvik (1954).

See also

World War I
German occupation of north-east France during World War I
Ribbons of the French military and civil awards

External links
 Chancellery and museum of the Legion of Honour 
 Entente combattants 

French medals by order of precedence==References==

Civil awards and decorations of France
France in World War I
Awards established in 1917
1917 establishments in France